Yechiel Hameiri (born 29 August 1949) is an Israeli former international footballer who competed at the 1970 FIFA World Cup.

Hameiri played in one official game for the Israeli national side.

References

1949 births
Living people
Israeli footballers
Israel international footballers
Hapoel Haifa F.C. players
Hapoel Acre F.C. players
Liga Leumit players
Footballers from Kfar Blum
1970 FIFA World Cup players
Association football goalkeepers